The 2015 Pan-American Volleyball Cup was the fourteenth edition of the annual women's volleyball tournament, played by twelve countries over June, 2014 in Lima and Callao, Peru. The competition served as a qualifier for the 2016 FIVB World Grand Prix. The United States won their fourth championship defeating 3–0 to the Dominican Republic and the American Krista Vansant won the Most Valuable Player of the tournament.

Competing nations

Qualification for FIVB Grand Prix
The top two teams from the NORCECA confederation and the top from CSV will play first group from the 2016 FIVB World Grand Prix. The third, fourth and fifth ranked teams from NORCECA and the second best ranked from CSV will play the second group. The third ranked from CSV and the sixth from NORCECA will take part in the third group.

Pool standing procedure
Match won 3–0: 5 points for the winner, 0 point for the loser
Match won 3–1: 4 points for the winner, 1 points for the loser
Match won 3–2: 3 points for the winner, 2 points for the loser
In case of tie, the teams were classified according to the following criteria:
points ratio and sets ratio

Preliminary round

Group A

Group B

Final round

Championship bracket

7th to 10th places bracket

Classification 11–12

Classification 7–10

Quarterfinals

Classification 9–10

Classification 5–8

Classification 7–8

Classification 5–6

Semifinals

Classification 3–4

Final

Final standing

Individual awards

Most Valuable Player
  Krista Vansant
Best Setter
  Carli Lloyd
Best Outside Hitters
  Krista Vansant
  Melissa Vargas
Best Middle Blockers
  Alena Rojas
  Lucille Charuk
Best Opposite
  Ángela Leyva
Best Scorer
  Melissa Vargas
Best Server
  Melissa Vargas
Best Libero
  Brenda Castillo
Best Digger
  Brenda Castillo
Best Receiver
  Brenda Castillo

References

Women's Pan-American Volleyball Cup
Pan-American Volleyball Cup
Women's Pan-American Volleyball Cup
2015 Women's Pan-American Volleyball Cup
Sports competitions in Lima